The 2020 Tampa Bay Vipers season was the first season for the Tampa Bay Vipers as a professional American football franchise. They played as charter members of the XFL, one of eight teams to compete in the league for the 2020 season. The Vipers played their home games at Raymond James Stadium and were led by head coach Marc Trestman.

Their inaugural season was cut short due to the COVID-19 pandemic and the XFL officially suspended operations for the remainder of the season on March 20, 2020.

Standings

Schedule
All times Eastern

Final roster

Staff

Season summary 
In the first week of the season, the Vipers took a loss to the New York Guardians, only scoring a field goal in the 3rd quarter. They then lost to the Seattle Dragons in the second week of the season, losing 17–9 in Seattle. Even after the two losses, they put up a fight against the then 2-0 Houston Roughnecks, only losing by a mere 7 points at home. They got their first win of the XFL season against the DC Defenders, shutting them out 25–0 to advance to 1–3. In week 5, they blew an 18-point lead and lost to the Los Angeles Wildcats on the road 41–34.

Game summaries

Week 1: at New York Guardians

Tampa Bay entered the game as a 3½ point favorite, but went on to suffer a 20-point blowout loss on the road. The Vipers suffered 4 turnovers and gave up 3 touchdowns while only getting 1 field goal, despite getting inside the 5-yard line multiple times.

Week 2: at Seattle Dragons

Week 3: Houston Roughnecks

Week 4: DC Defenders

Week 5: at Los Angeles Wildcats

References

Tampa Bay Vipers
Tampa Bay Vipers
Tampa Bay Vipers